Bernard Charles Wolter (February 26, 1852March 31, 1936) was a German American immigrant, businessman, and Republican politician.  He was the 30th mayor of Appleton, Wisconsin, and represented Outagamie County in the Wisconsin State Assembly in 1897 and 1898.  In contemporaneous documents he was often referred to as B. C. Wolter.

Biography

Born in the Grand Duchy of Mecklenburg-Schwerin (modern day Germany), Wolter emigranted to the United States in 1854. He went to public schools in Outagamie County, Wisconsin, and Neenah High School in Neenah, Wisconsin. Wolter graduated from University of Wisconsin in 1875, with a degree in civil engineering. He sold agricultural implements and lived in Appleton, Wisconsin. He served as president of Wolter Motor Company in Appleton, Wisconsin. Wolter served as county clerk for Outagamie County from 1878 to 1886, and was a Republican. In 1897 and 1898, Wolter served in the Wisconsin State Assembly. Later, Wolter also served as mayor of Appleton, Wisconsin from 1908 to 1910. Wolter died in Appleton, Wisconsin.

References

External links

1852 births
1936 deaths
German emigrants to the United States
People from Mecklenburg
Politicians from Appleton, Wisconsin
University of Wisconsin–Madison College of Engineering alumni
Businesspeople from Wisconsin
County clerks in Wisconsin
Mayors of places in Wisconsin
Republican Party members of the Wisconsin State Assembly